Lézignan-Corbières is a railway station in Lézignan-Corbières, Occitanie, southern France. Within TER Occitanie, it is part of lines 10 (Toulouse–Narbonne) and 25 (Toulouse–Portbou).

References

Railway stations in Aude